Amore libero - Free Love, also known as The Real Emanuelle, is a 1974 erotic-adventure film directed by Pier Ludovico Pavoni.

It represents the acting debut of Laura Gemser, who moved to Italy from the Netherlands to take part in the film. Gemser was credited in the opening credits of the film and in the advertising material with the name Emanuelle as a reference to the more famous Emmanuelle played by Sylvia Kristel. The film, shot in the Seychelles, was a box office success and launched the career of Gemser in Italian genre cinema.

Cast
 Laura Gemser as Janine (credited as Emanuelle)
 Enzo Bottesini as Francesco Ferrero 
 Venantino Venantini as Chaval
 Olga Bisera as Katia
 Ugo Cardea as Frate Giuseppe

References

External links

1974 films
Italian adventure films
Films shot in Seychelles
Italian sexploitation films
Films about race and ethnicity
Films set on islands
Films scored by Fabio Frizzi
1970s Italian films